Brazil competed at the 1984 Summer Olympics in Los Angeles, United States. 147 competitors, 126 men and 21 women, took part in 82 events in 17 sports. The country set a record with 8 medals - only surpassed in 1996 with 15 , but only one medal was gold.

The runner Joaquim Cruz won the men's 800 metres event with an Olympic record. This was the first and until nowadays the only gold medal achieved by Brazilians in a track event in Athletics - all the other gold medals were in field events.

Brazilian football and volleyball men's teams started their success in Olympic history winning for the first time an Olympic medal. Both teams were silver medalists. The Olympic football team lost the final to France by 2 - 0. 
Brazil men's national volleyball team was defeated by host country United States by 3 sets to 0.

The swimmer Ricardo Prado was the silver medalist in the men's 400 metre individual medley. The sailor Torben Grael won the silver medal in the Soling class together with Daniel Adler and Ronaldo Senfft. It was the first Olympic medal won by Grael, who has five Olympic medals, a record only equaled by sailor Robert Scheidt

Brazilian judokas won three Olympic medals in 1984. Douglas Vieira was a silver medalist in men's 95 kg category. Luis Onmura was a bronze medalist in men's 71 kg and Walter Carmona conquered bronze medal in men's 86 kg.

Medalists

| width=78% align=left valign=top |

|  style="text-align:left; width:22%; vertical-align:top;"|

Archery

In its second Olympic archery competition, Brazil sent only one man. Veteran Renato Emilio fell drastically in the ranking despite having improved upon his score from 1980 by 99 points.
Men

Athletics

Men
Track & road events

Field events

Women
Track & road events

Field events

Combined events – Heptathlon

Basketball

Men's Team Competition

Group A

Team Roster
Nilo Guimarães
Silvio Malvezi
Gerson Victalino
Milton Setrini Júnior
Ricardo Guimarães
Marcos Leite
Eduardo Galvão
Marcel Souza
Adilson Nascimento
Marcelo Vido
Oscar Schmidt
Israel Machado

Cycling

Seven cyclists represented Brazil in 1984.

Road

Track
1000m time trial

Men's Sprint

Points race

Pursuit

Diving

Women

Equestrianism

Show jumping

Football

Brazil won the silver medal for men's football, their first ever. Even though Brazil has won more Soccer World Cups than any other country, they have never won a football gold medal at any olympics.
The Brazilian team was entirely made by players of Sport Club Internacional, of Porto Alegre. Amongst them, was 1994 World Cup captain, Dunga.

First round

Group C

Quarter-finals

Semi-finals

Gold Medal match

Gymnastics

Artistic
Men

Women

Judo

A traditional sport in Brazil, Judo has warranted three medals, for Brazilian men. Two bronze medals, and a silver medal.
Men

Rhythmic gymnastics

Rowing

Men

Sailing

Open

Shooting

Men

Women

Open

Swimming

Men

Synchronized swimming

Women

Volleyball

Men's Team Competition

Pool A

|}

|}

Semifinals

|}

Gold medal match

|}
Team Roster
 Renan dal Zotto
 William Carvalho da Silva
 Fernando d'Àvila
 Mário Xandó de Oliveira Neto
 Bernardo Rocha de Rezende
 Rui Campos do Nascimento
 Marcus Vinicius Simòes Freire
 Domingos Lampariello Neto
 José Montanaro
 Bernard Rajzman
 Antônio Carlos Gueiros Ribeiro
Head coach: Bebeto de Freitas

Women's Team Competition

Group A

|}

|}

5th–8th place semifinals

|}

7th place natch

|}
Team Roster
 Vera Mossa
 Fernanda Emerick Silva
 Mônica da Silva
 Isabel Salgado
 Heloísa Roese
 Regina Vilela Santos-Uchoa
 Jackie Silva
 Ana Richa
 Sandra Suruagy
 Eliana da Costa
 Luiza Machado
 Ida Alvares
Head coach: Ênio Figueiredo

Water polo

Men's Team Competition

Group B

August 1

August 2

August 3

Group E

August 6

August 7

August 9

August 10

Team Roster
 Roberto Borelli
 Orlando Chaves
 Paulo Sérgio Abreu
 Carlos Carvalho
 Silvio Manfredi
 Sólon Santos
 Ricardo Tonieto
 Eric Tebbe Borges
 Mário Souto
 Mário Sérgio Lotufo
 Fernando Carsalade
 Hélio Silva
 André Campos

References

Nations at the 1984 Summer Olympics
1984
Olympics